Mao (stylized as MAO) is a Japanese manga series written and illustrated by Rumiko Takahashi. It has been serialized in Shogakukan's Weekly Shōnen Sunday magazine since May 2019, with its chapters collected in fifteen tankōbon volumes as of January 2023. In North America, the series is licensed for English release by Viz Media.

Plot
Eight years ago, Nanoka Kiba was saved from the wreckage of a fatal accident at Gogyō Town Shopping Center. Drawn to the abandoned passage of storefronts on her walk home from school in present day, she becomes inexplicably transported to Japan's Taishō period where she meets the mysterious Mao, a fellow traveler whose arrival at a ghost-inhabited village is simultaneous with hers. Together, they investigate the bizarre events that begin to occur around them, and Nanoka soon pieces together her broken memories of the accident and how she and Mao may have something more sinister in common.

Characters
 
 The wielder of a deadly longsword, Hagunsei , Mao is a man cursed in many ways. Known as an onmyōji, he searches for the whereabouts of the byōki, a powerful kodoku created from a terrifying ritual. He is also able to lend some of his blood to Nanoka as they share byōki blood. Mao sees himself as sort of a guardian to Nanoka. He is one of the Kou Clan Manor disciples from 900 years ago and lives as a doctor in the Taishō era.
 
 A plucky third-year middle school student. She died when she was eight years old, but miraculously still lives on. Now fifteen, she uses an abandoned shopping district passage to travel to the Taishō era and investigate mysterious killings, cults, and disappearances with Mao. Like Mao, she is also cursed by the byōki and can therefore wield the Hagunsei and lend some of her blood to Mao. She currently wields the Akanemaru , a sword that sucks blood from its wielder. She seems to have developed a crush on Mao.
 
 A shikigami and Mao's assistant. He is very knowledgeable about medicine and is rational, helping in battle.
 
 A shikigami sent by Mao to look after Nanoka. She creates the "disgusting" shakes that suppress Nanoka's byōki energy.
 
It has visited Nanoka and provided information a few times, thought its goal is unknown.
 
 A friend of Mao's who operates a dining establishment and through a network of connections provides him with the latest gossip in the Taishō period.
 
 A fire element user who was on friendly terms with Mao and his senior when they lived at the Kou Clan Manor in the Heian period. Hyakka was once in love with Sana and was led to believe Mao was guilty in ending her life.
 
 A wood element user who occasionally joins forces with Mao when it is convenient for him. He has an interest in Masago's fate.
 
 A kind and powerful water element user and disciple of the Kou Clan Manor. Although dead, she was captured by Shiranui for her powers. She saves Kamon, who was about to die underwater in battle, by kissing him before she passes away.
 
 A water element user who has an obsessive interest in Mao. He was also a rather lackluster disciple of the Kou Clan Manor.
 
He previously fought against Hyakka in the Russo-Japanese War, holding a grudge against him, and has an old alliance with Yurako.
 
 A mysterious woman who bears resemblance to Sana. She was confined to a cave to become a vessel for other poisonous curses and have sutras inked on her skin before she escaped. It is at this time that she first met Mao. She reveals her past and true appearance to Nanoka.
 
 Daughter of the Kou Clan Master, who Mao knows to have been in love with another. As a result of the master's wishes, Mao and Sana believed themselves to be betrothed. However, Sana was in love with Daigo.
 
 An orphan and older brother figure to Mao. After leaving the orphanage where they were both raised, he recommends Mao to join the Kou Clan as he did. During his time in the Kou clan, he grew to be one of the best earth element users. He was in love with Sana but soon died an ominous death.
 
 A laid-back earth element user and disciple of the Kou Clan Manor who Mao occasionally calls upon for help. She is looking for an earthen golem she made a pact with 900 years ago when she fell ill.
 
 Working under Shiranui as an assassin known as Okuribi no Renji, he uses a Yuechin  as a medium to store the fire flies powered by a kodoku from a Life Extension Garden called Enmei no Niwa . He has a fondness for prostitutes, providing them money and being kind, stemming from his childhood abuse. His presumably kind parents adopted children to make them earn money, abused them, and sold them off, including their biological son, Renji. His adopted sister, Tsuyu, was Renji's only solace. She played the Yueqin and treated his wounds. Later, she sold herself in place of Renji, was abused by her husband till her death, who buried her in the garden soil "like trash" with her Yueqin, and paid a large sum to the parents to avoid any suspicion. Renji vowed to avenge her and burned the house his parents were in as well as the households that abused the sold-off, adopted children. Mao has cut his right arm twice to prevent him from playing the Yueqin that releases fireflies that go through any gap into humans and burn them from inside. His arm is always healed by Mei, who takes care of the Enmei no Niwa. He is from the Taishō period.
 
 From the Taishō period, Mei also works under Shiranui as a doctor managing a Life Extension Garden called Enmei no Niwa .

Publication
Mao is written and illustrated by Rumiko Takahashi and was announced in Shogakukan's Weekly Shōnen Sunday in December 2018. The manga started in Weekly Shōnen Sunday on May 8, 2019. A 2-part interview between Takahashi and Satoru Noda, author of Golden Kamuy, was published in Weekly Shōnen Sunday and Shueisha's Weekly Young Jump to celebrate the then upcoming first volume of Mao and the new volume of Golden Kamuy in September 2019. Shogakukan has collected the manga chapters into individual tankōbon volumes. The first volume was published on September 18, 2019. A promotional commercial for the fifth volume release, narrated by Inuyashas character Sesshomaru (Ken Narita), was posted in August 2020. A promotional commercial for sixth volume release, narrated by Inuyasha'''s characters Inuyasha (Kappei Yamaguchi) and Kagome (Satsuki Yukino), was posted in October 2020. On July 7, 2021, the series reached 100 chapters and a promotional commercial, featuring Yuki Kaji as Mao (who previously expressed his interest to participate in an eventual anime adaptation of the series), Hiro Shimono as Hyakka and Toshiyuki Toyonaga as Kamon, was posted. As of January 18, 2023, fifteen volumes have been released.

In February 2021, Viz Media announced that they licensed the series for English release in North America and the first volume was published on September 14, 2021. The series has also been licensed in France by Glénat, in Italy by Star Comics and in Indonesia by Elex Media Komputindo.

Volume list

Chapters not yet in tankōbon format

Reception
As of July 2021, the manga had 1 million copies in circulation. In December 2019, Brutus magazine listed Mao on their "Most Dangerous Manga" list, which included works with the most "stimulating" and thought-provoking themes. The School Library Journal listed the first volume of Mao as one of the top 10 manga of 2021.

In her review of the first volume, Rebecca Silverman of Anime News Network ranked it as B−. Silverman called the series’ time period and its world building elements interesting, praising as well Takahashi's art. Silverman, however, criticized the series for its "reused" story elements and character designs, noting similarities to Takahashi's previous works like Inuyasha and Rin-ne. Also reviewing the first volume, Nick Smith of ICv2 commented that Mao is "closest to Inuyasha'' in style", and while he stated that the series has "nothing new or innovative", he praised the story and its artwork, adding: "[t]his is the start of what could turn out to be another classic series, if the story develops from this starting point."

References

Further reading

External links
 

Adventure anime and manga
Anime and manga about time travel
Dark fantasy anime and manga
Fiction set in 1923
Shogakukan manga
Shōnen manga
Supernatural anime and manga
Taishō period in fiction
Viz Media manga
Works by Rumiko Takahashi